Charles Erwin Brown (born October 26, 1947, in Minneapolis, Minnesota) is an ice hockey player who played for the American national team. He won a silver medal at the 1972 Winter Olympics.

References

External links
 

1947 births
American men's ice hockey defensemen
Ice hockey players at the 1972 Winter Olympics
Living people
Medalists at the 1972 Winter Olympics
Olympic silver medalists for the United States in ice hockey